Cbl (named after Casitas B-lineage Lymphoma) is a mammalian gene encoding the protein CBL which is an E3 ubiquitin-protein ligase involved in cell signalling and protein ubiquitination. Mutations to this gene have been implicated in a number of human cancers, particularly acute myeloid leukaemia.

Discovery 
In 1989 a virally encoded portion of the chromosomal mouse Cbl gene was the first member of the Cbl family to be discovered and was named v-Cbl to distinguish it from normal mouse c-Cbl. The virus used in the experiment was a mouse-tropic strain of Murine leukemia virus isolated from the brain of a mouse captured at Lake Casitas, California known as Cas-Br-M, and was found to have excised approximately a third of the original c-Cbl gene from a mouse into which it was injected. Sequencing revealed that the portion carried by the retrovirus encoded a tyrosine kinase binding domain, and that this was the oncogenic form as retroviruses carrying full-length c-Cbl did not induce tumor formation. The resultant transformed retrovirus was found to consistently induce a type of pre-B lymphoma, known as Casitas B-lineage lymphoma, in infected mice.

Structure 
Full length c-Cbl has been found to consist of several regions encoding for functionally distinct protein domains:
 N-terminal tyrosine kinase binding domain (TKB domain): determines the protein which it can bind to
 RING finger domain motif: recruits enzymes involved in ubiquitination
 Proline-rich region: the site of interaction between Cbl and cytosolic proteins involved in Cbl's adaptor functions
 C-terminal ubiquitin-associated domain (UBA domain): the site of ubiquitin binding

This domain structure and the tyrosine and serine-rich content of the protein product is typical of an "adaptor molecule" used in cell signalling pathways.

Homologues 
Three mammalian homologues have been characterized, which all differ in their ability to function as adaptor proteins due to the differing lengths of their C-terminal UBA domains:
 c-Cbl: ubiquitously expressed, 906 and 913 amino acids in length in humans and mice respectively
 Cbl-b: ubiquitously expressed, 982 amino acids long.
 Cbl-c: lacks the UBA domain and is therefore only 474 amino acids in length. It is primarily expressed in epithelial cells however its function is poorly understood.

Both c-Cbl and Cbl-b have orthologues in D. melanogaster (D-Cbl) and C. elegans (Sli-1), hinting at a long evolutionary path for these proteins.

Function

Ubiquitin ligase 
Ubiquitination is the process of chemically attaching ubiquitin monomers to a protein, thereby targeting it for degradation. As this is a multi-step process, several different enzymes are involved, the final one being a member of the E3 family of ligases. Cbl functions as an E3 ligase, and therefore is able to catalyse the formation of a covalent bond between ubiquitin and Cbl's protein substrate - typically a receptor tyrosine kinase. The RING-finger domain mediates this transfer, however like other E3 ligases of the RING type no intermediate covalent bond is formed between ubiquitin and the RING-finger domain. The stepwise attachment of ubiquitin to the substrate receptor tyrosine kinase can lead to its removal from the plasma membrane and subsequent trafficking to the lysosome for degradation.

Interactions 

Cbl gene has been shown to interact with:

 Abl gene,
 ARHGEF7,
 C-Met,
 CD2AP,
 CSF1R.
 CRK,
 CRKL,
 EGFR,<
 FRS2,
 FYN,
 Grb2,
 HCK,
 IGF1R,
 LCP2;,
 NCK1,
 PDGFRA,
 PIK3R1,
 PIK3R2,
 PLCG1,
 PTK2B,
 PTPN11,
 SH2B2,
 SH3KBP1
 SHC1,
 SLA2,
 SORBS1,
 SORBS2,
 SPRY2,
 Syk,
 UBE2L3,
 VAV1,
 YWHAB,
 YWHAQ, and
 ZAP-70,

References

Further reading

External links 
 Quips article describing CBL function at PDBe
  OMIM entries on NOONAN SYNDROME-LIKE DISORDER WITH OR WITHOUT JUVENILE MYELOMONOCYTIC LEUKEMIA and CBL
 

Proteins